The 1958–59 IHL season was the 14th season of the International Hockey League, a North American minor professional league. Five teams participated in the regular season, and the Louisville Rebels won the Turner Cup.

Regular season

Turner Cup-Playoffs

External links
 Season 1958/59 on hockeydb.com

IHL
International Hockey League (1945–2001) seasons